The Harper Runabout is a three-wheeled motor vehicle designed by Robert Harper. It was manufactured in Manchester, England, by A.V. Roe & Co. from 1921 until 1926, by which time about 500 Harpers had been produced.

References

External links
Video of a 1923 Harper Runabout in action

Three-wheeled motor vehicles
Cars introduced in 1921